Nicholas Rippen Abberly  (March 25, 1891 – April 1983) was an American pioneer aviator and member of the Early Birds of Aviation. He also was an inventor and an illustrator using several names and alternate spellings of his name.

Biography 
He was born on March 25, 1891.

He built and flew a pusher configuration aircraft from Mineola, New York on Long Island in September 1910. He soloed the aircraft in October 1910.

An inventor by trade, Abberly filed several patents in a wide body of disciplines, including a bottom for floating equipment, rebound equipment for fitness machines, office clipboards, and hot-formed metal columns.

He also created the drawings for Alexander Weygers's Discopter patent.

Nicolas adopted several names to identify his work, using Abberly and an alternate spelling Aaberly and at times, Rippen, which is visible on the US2377835 patent drawings.

He died in April 1983 in Cedar Rapids, Iowa.

Patents

References 

1891 births
1983 deaths
Members of the Early Birds of Aviation
20th-century American engineers
Aviators from Iowa
20th-century American inventors